Mihovil Dorčić (born 12 March 1938) is a Yugoslav former swimmer. He competed in two events at the 1960 Summer Olympics.

References

External links
 

1938 births
Living people
People from Primorje-Gorski Kotar County
Croatian male swimmers
Yugoslav male swimmers
Olympic swimmers of Yugoslavia
Swimmers at the 1960 Summer Olympics
Universiade medalists in swimming
Universiade bronze medalists for Yugoslavia
Medalists at the 1959 Summer Universiade
Swimmers at the 1959 Mediterranean Games
Mediterranean Games medalists in swimming
Mediterranean Games silver medalists for Yugoslavia